The Port of Taranto is a port serving Taranto, southeastern Italy. One of the first in Italy for goods traffic, it is located on the northern coast of the gulf and plays an important role commercially and strategically. It has three entrances, two of which are operational. Its management is entrusted to the Port Authority, which is based within the port. Since 2011 the container terminal has been run by the Taranto Container Terminal SpA, which is  60% owned by Hutchison Whampoa and 40% owned by Evergreen Marine Corporation.

History

Roman times
During the Second Punic War Taranto (then called Tarentum) was first captured by the Carthaginians during the Battle of Tarentum (212 BC) and then recaptured by the Romans in the Battle of Tarentum (209 BC).

World War II
During World War II, there were two important military operation in Taranto, the Battle of Taranto in 1940 and Operation Slapstick in 1943.

References

Ports and harbours of Italy
Taranto